El fantasma del convento (lit. The Ghost of the Convent; American release title: The Phantom of the Convent) is a 1934 Mexican horror film directed by Fernando de Fuentes, who also co-wrote and edited the film.

Plot

Cristina (Marta Roel), the wife of Eduardo (Carlos Villatoro), tries to seduce their friend, Alfonso (Enrique del Campo).  One night, they lose their way and are guided by a mysterious stranger to an eerie monastery.

Over a meal, the old Father Superior (Paco Martinez) tells them the story of a monk who seduced a friend's wife:  when he died, the monk could not find peace in death and returned to his cursed cell.  Alfonso, about to give in to Cristina's advances, finds the fateful cell and enters it.  The sinful monk's mummified corpse gestures towards a book dripping with blood.

When the cadaver of Eduardo appears to him as well, Alfonso sinks into a delirium.  When he wakes, the trio find out that the monastery has been a ruin for many years and the crypt with the mummified monk has become a tourist attraction.  During a final meal in the spectral setting, Cristina accuses Alfonso of cowardice.

Cast
 Enrique del Campo as Alfonso
 Marta Roel as Cristina
 Carlos Villatoro as Eduardo
 Paco Martínez as Padre Prior
 Victorio Blanco as Monje

Production

El fantasma del convento was co written and produced by Jorge Pezet and directed by Fernando de Fuentes. Development and production for the film began in 1933. Following the success of La Llorona which was based on the legendary spirit of the same name, and was co-written by director Fuentes, the filmmakers quickly decided to follow-up with the film's success with another horror film.  The idea for the film came from producer Jorge Pezet. Pezet had recently developed a fascination with the desiccated mummies displayed in Mexico's Museo de El Carmen. Determined to use them for a film, Pezet, along with director Fuentes, and Juan Bustillo Oro developed a screenplay that featured three young adults who are forced to spend the night at a monastery only to discover that their hosts were members of the undead. Filming took place on location in a Teotzotlan monastery.

Reception

Unlike 1933's La Llorona, El Fantasma del Convento was not released to American audiences, though it has amassed a cult following in more recent years with the rise of the Blu-ray Disc and online purchases, allowing for more reviews to come through to larger audiences. On his website Fantastic Movie Musings and Ramblings, Dave Sindelar called it "one of the best of the Mexican horror movies", praising its striking imagery and use of sound.On IMDb, the film holds a score of 6.9 stars out of 10, resulting in "above average" reviews. On  Rotten Tomatoes, the film holds a 57% percent score with audiences, while holding a "Fresh" Rating from critics.

References

External links
 
 
 

1934 horror films
1930s ghost films
1930s supernatural horror films
Mexican black-and-white films
1930s Spanish-language films
Mexican supernatural horror films
Films directed by Fernando de Fuentes
Films set in religious buildings and structures
Films shot in Mexico
Adultery in films
Mummy films
1930s Mexican films